Pudukudi South is a village in the Budalur taluk of Thanjavur district in the Indian state of Tamil Nadu.

Demographics 

As per the 2001 census, Pudukudi South had a total population of 357 with 175 males and 182 females. The sex ratio was 1040. The literacy rate was 63.23.

References

See also 
 Pudukudi North

Villages in Thanjavur district